The ACB Best Coach is the annual award that is given to the best coach of each regular season phase of the Liga ACB, which is the top-tier level professional club basketball league in the country of Spain. The award began with the Liga ACB 2007–08 season. The Spanish Basketball Coaches Association, also gives a coach of the year award, the AEEB Coach of the Year Award, which has been awarded since the 1974–75 season.

Liga ACB Best Coach award winners

See also
AEEB Coach of the Year Award

References

External links 
 Spanish ACB League official website 
 Spanish ACB League at eurobasket.com

 
Basketball coaching awards
Spanish sports trophies and awards

Awards established in 2007
2007 establishments in Spain